The 1980 Air Canada Cup was Canada's second annual national midget 'AAA' hockey championship, which was played April 15 – 20, 1980 at the Cornwall Civic Complex in Cornwall, Ontario.  The Notre Dame Hounds won their first national championship, defeating the Gouverneurs de Ste-Foy in the gold medal game.  The North Shore Winter Club of North Vancouver, British Columbia won the bronze medal.

The two most notable players in this tournament were future Hall of Famers Steve Yzerman of the Nepean Raiders and Ron Francis of the Sault Ste. Marie Legion.  Other future National Hockey League players competing were Lyndon Byers, Brian Curran, Dean Evason, Gary Leeman, Gerard Gallant, Ron Hextall, James Patrick, Darren Pang, and Michel Petit.

Teams

Round robin

DC8 Flight

Standings

Scores

Notre Dame 9 - Fort Frances 3
North Shore 9 - Brandon 0
Sault Ste. Marie 5 - Calgary 2
North Shore 7 - Fort Frances 1
Notre Dame 7 - Calgary 2
Sault Ste. Marie 4 - Brandon 2
Calgary 3 - Brandon 1
Sault Ste. Marie 5 - Fort Frances 0
Notre Dame 6 - North Shore 4
Calgary 12 - Fort Frances 1
Notre Dame 4 - Brandon 2
North Shore 6 - Sault Ste. Marie 2
Calgary 3 - North Shore 0
Brandon 7 - Fort Frances 3
Notre Dame 5 - Sault Ste. Marie 3

DC9 Flight

Standings

Scores

Moncton 6 - Sherwood-Parkdale 3
Ste-Foy 11 - St. John's 1
Halifax 3 - Nepean 2
Halifax 3 - Moncton 1
Ste-Foy 12 - Sherwood-Parkdale 2
Nepean 9 - St. John's 2
Halifax 5 - St. John's 2
Ste-Foy 5 - Moncton 2
Nepean 10 - Sherwood-Parkdale 3
Ste-Foy 4 - Halifax 1
St. John's 7 - Sherwood-Parkdale 6
Nepean 6 - Moncton 2
Moncton 6 - St. John's 3
Sherwood-Parkdale 3 - Halifax 2
Ste-Foy 5 - Nepean 2

Playoffs

Bronze medal game
North Shore 5 - Halifax 1

Gold medal game
Notre Dame 5 - Ste-Foy 1

Individual awards
Most Valuable Player: Gord Flegel (Notre Dame)
Top Scorer: Richard Linteau (Ste-Foy)
Top Forward: Rejean Bignola (Ste-Foy)
Top Defenceman: James Patrick (Notre Dame)
Top Goaltender: Robbie Richardson (Halifax)
Most Sportsmanlike Player: Randy Heath (North Shore)

See also
Telus Cup

References

External links
Telus Cup Website
Hockey Canada-Telus Cup Guide and Record Book

Telus Cup
Air Canada Cup
Sport in Cornwall, Ontario
April 1980 sports events in Canada